R82 may refer to:

 R82 (South Africa), a road
 , a destroyer of the Royal Navy
 Romano R.82, a French aerobatic trainer aircraft